The Katrin Cartlidge Foundation is a charitable foundation established in memory of actress Katrin Cartlidge, who died suddenly and unexpectedly in 2002, at the age of 41. Through the foundation, and as referenced to the Sarajevo Film Festival, support is provided to emerging filmmakers.

Foundation History 
The impact of the sudden death of actress Katrin Cartlidge saw the creation of the Katrin Cartlidge Foundation by trustees Mike Leigh, Peter Gevisser, Simon McBurney, Chris Simon and Cat Villiers. Patrons include Lars von Trier and Cartlidge's sister Michelle. Established at the Sarajevo Film Festival, an annual bursary is awarded by "an elected curator, chosen by the (Foundation) Trustees from a wide and eclectic number of Katrin Cartlidge’s friends and colleagues… (to) a new creative voice… While the new talent nominated each year will be a filmmaker, it is anticipated that the choices will be as varied and extraordinary as Katrin’s own choice of filmmakers and friends from across the arts."

Patrons

Annual Awards History 
 2012: Orwa Nyrabia and Diana El Jeiroudi, for their contribution to independent film in Syria at the 18th Sarajevo Film Festival
 Curator: Jeremy Irons
 2011: Hala Lotfy for The Strokes at the 17th Sarajevo Film Festival
 Curator: Charlotte Rampling
 2010: Ciné Institute, Haiti at the 16th Sarajevo Film Festival
 Curator: Annie Nocenti
 2009: Juanita Wilson for The Door at the 15th Sarajevo Film Festival
 Curator: Stellan Skarsgård
 2008: Faruk Šabanović at the 14th Sarajevo Film Festival
 Curator: Danis Tanović
 2007: Cary Fukunaga for Victoria Para Chino at the 13th Sarajevo Film Festival
 Curator: John Lyons
 2006: Eyas Salman and Gerd Schneider for The Edge Of Hope at the 12th Sarajevo Film Festival
 Curator: Simon McBurney and Juergen Teller
 2005: Amy Neil for Can't Stop Breathing at the 11th Sarajevo Film Festival
 Curator: Emily Watson
 2004: Greg Hall for The Plague at the 10th Sarajevo Film Festival
 Curator: Mike Leigh – described the film as "Serious, funny, real, surreal, and totally anarchic. Very exciting twenty-first-century kind of cinema."

References

External links 
 Katrin Cartlidge Foundation KatrinCartlidgeFoundation.org.uk 
 Sarajevo Film Festival SFF.ba

Foundations based in the United Kingdom
British film awards